Andy Baylock (born June 22, 1938) is a college athletics coach and administrator, most notable for serving as the head coach of the UConn Huskies baseball team from 1980–2003, appearing three times in the NCAA Tournament and winning a pair of Big East Conference baseball tournament titles.  At the time of his retirement, he was UConn's all-time wins leader, with 556, since eclipsed by his successor Jim Penders.

College career
Baylock attended Central Connecticut State University in New Britain, Connecticut, and was a four year letter-man in football and baseball.  He was a captain for both teams his senior year.

Coaching career
After his playing days, Baylock attended the University of Michigan where he earned a Master's degree and served as a graduate assistant coach with the Michigan Wolverines baseball team.  He then arrived at UConn as the freshman baseball coach for one season, before becoming a football and baseball assistant for 15 years.  During his tenure on the UConn baseball staff under head coach Larry Panciera, the Huskies appeared in 3 College World Series, 4 additional NCAA Tournaments, and won their conference 8 times.

After Panciera's retirement following the 1979 season, Baylock ascended to the head coaching position, a role he would occupy for 24 seasons, before stepping down in 2003.

Head coaching record
The following table shows Baylock's record as a head coach.

References

Living people
1938 births
Central Connecticut Blue Devils baseball players
Central Connecticut Blue Devils football players
Michigan Wolverines baseball coaches
UConn Huskies baseball coaches
UConn Huskies football coaches
University of Michigan alumni